Lake Kirikumäe is a lake of Estonia.

See also
List of lakes of Estonia

Kirikumae
Võru Parish
Kirikumae